Portulacaria pygmaea (previously Ceraria pygmaea), also known as the pygmy porkbush, is a small-leaved dwarf succulent plant found on the border between Namibia and South Africa.

Description
It is a small, compact, soft-wooded, dwarf shrub with Unisexual flowers(dioecious). Its blue-green leaves are semi-evergreen. Its tiny compact branches spread, and often droop, staying close to the ground. 
It also develops a thick caudex or root-stock, which has led to it being a popular bonsai specimen.

Within the genus Portulacaria it is most closely related to its larger sister-species Portulacaria fruticulosa.

References

pygmaea
Flora of Namibia
Flora of South Africa
Garden plants of Africa
Caudiciform plants
Plants used in bonsai